Daniel Björnquist (born 8 January 1989), sometimes spelled Daniel Björnkvist or Daniel Björnqvist, is a Swedish footballer who plays for Örebro SK as a defender.

References

External links
 
 

1989 births
Living people
Association football defenders
Örebro SK players
BK Forward players
AFC Eskilstuna players
Swedish footballers
Allsvenskan players
Superettan players